Established in 1891, Buckinghamshire County Cricket Club is one of the nineteen county clubs which form the Minor counties of English and Welsh cricket.  Not afforded first-class status, Buckinghamshire have however played List A cricket, making its first List A appearance in the 1965 Gillette Cup against Middlesex.  This continued until it was announced that the Minor counties would be excluded from the Cheltenham & Gloucester Trophy from the 2006 season onward.

Team
 Highest Total For: 424/5 v Suffolk at Dinton Park, Dinton, 2002
 Highest Total Against: 401/7 by Gloucestershire at Ascott Park, Ascott, 2003
 Lowest Total For: 77 v Gloucestershire at Ascott Park, Ascott, 2003
 Lowest Total Against: 41 by Cambridgeshire at Fenner's, Cambridge, 1972

Batting
 Highest Score: 140 David Taylor v Suffolk, Dinton Cricket Club Ground, 2002
 Most Runs in Season: 154 David Taylor, 2002

Most List A runs for Buckinghamshire
Qualification - 150 runs

Highest Partnership for each wicket
The following are the record partnerships for each wicket:

Bowling
 Best Bowling: 5/17 Raymond Bond v Cambridgeshire at Fenner's, Cambridge, 1972
 Wickets in Season: 10, Andrew Clarke, 2002

Most List A wickets for Buckinghamshire
Qualification - 8 wickets

References

See also
 Buckinghamshire County Cricket Club
 List of Buckinghamshire CCC List A players

Buckinghamshire
Cricket in Buckinghamshire
Buckinghamshire County Cricket Club
Cricket